The Shapley attractor is an attractor located about the Shapley Supercluster.

It is opposed to the Dipole Repeller, in the CMB dipole of local galactic flow. It is thought to be the composite contributions of the Shapley Concentration and the Great Attractor.

References

Shapley Supercluster